The 22323 / 22324 Shabd Bhedi Superfast Express is a Superfast Express train belonging to Eastern Railway zone that runs between Ghazipur City and Kolkata in India. It is currently being operated with 22324/22323 train numbers on a weekly basis.

Service

The 22324/Shabd Bhedi Superfast Express has an average speed of 56 km/hr and covers 761 km in 13h 30m. The 22323/Shabd Bhedi Superfast Express has an average speed of 55 km/hr and covers 761 km in 13h 45m.

Route & halts

The important halts of the train are:

Coach composition

The train has standard LHB rakes with max speed of 110 kmph. The train consists of 18 coaches:

 Executive Class
 Premium Class

Traction

Both trains are hauled by a Howrah based WAP-7 (HOG)-equipped locomotive from Ghazipur City to Kolkata and vice versa.

Direction reversal

The train reverses its direction 1 times:

Rake sharing arrangement 

The trains shares its rake with 13122 / 13121 Kolkata–Ghazipur City Weekly Express

See also 

 Kolkata railway station
 Ghazipur City railway station
 Kolkata–Ghazipur City Weekly Express
 Suhaildev Superfast Express

References

External links 

 22324/Shabd Bhedi Superfast Express India Rail Info
 22323/Shabd Bhedi Superfast Express India Rail Info

Transport in Kolkata
Transport in Ghazipur
Express trains in India
Rail transport in West Bengal
Rail transport in Jharkhand
Rail transport in Bihar
Rail transport in Uttar Pradesh
Railway services introduced in 2016
Named passenger trains of India